Halba may refer to:
 Halba, Lebanon, a city in northern Lebanon
 Halba (tribe), an ethnic group of India
 Halba language, a language of India
 Halba (Martian crater)
 Chocolats Halba, a Swiss chocolate producer
 Hilary Halba, New Zealand actress

See also 
 Beni Halba tribe, a group in Sudan
 Alba, the Gaelic name for Scotland, of which the inflected form "h-Alba" appears in names